Chame may refer to:

 Chame, Nepal
 Chame, Panama
 Dormitator latifrons (Pacific Fat Sleeper), a food fish